Tambu may refer to:

 Tambu (musical genre), a genre of music from the Caribbean
 Tambu (album), a 1995 album by the band Toto
 Tambu, a fictional island in the Australian drama The Lost Islands
 Mount Tambu, New Guinea, site of the Battle of Mount Tambu
 Tambu, a 1979 novel by Robert Asprin.
 Tambu or Tabu, the shell money of the Tolai people.